A Different American Dream is a 2016 American documentary film by Simon Brook and Jane I. Wells. It was produced by 3 Generations and Brook Productions. In 2016, the film was selected for a number of festivals, including the Thessaloniki International Film Festival, the Margaret Mead Film Festival and the Reykjavík International Film Festival.

Synopsis 
The documentary focuses on the inhabitants of the Fort Berthold Indian Reservation in the Badlands of North Dakota as their lives, their communities and their environment are profoundly transformed by the tight oil (shale oil) industry that promises wealth but sometimes delivers devastation.

References 

American documentary films
2016 films
Films shot in North Dakota
Films set in North Dakota
2010s American films